The Special Counter Terrorism Unit (SOBT) is the police tactical unit of the Bulgarian Ministry of Interior. Its main task is to react against critical acts of terrorism that are aimed at the national security and safety of the citizens.

History
After the Bulgarian Communist Party came to power on September 9, 1944, one of the first acts of the government was to form a new law enforcement agency - the People's Militia (Bulgarian: Народна милиция). In the ideological stylistics of the new regime, terrorism was understood mainly as acts of industrial sabotage and ideological subversion by small groups organized and infiltrated by the countries of the capitalist world - the Socialist Bloc's main adversary during the Cold War. As such, the main counter-terror force of the People's Republic of Bulgaria was the Internal Troops of the Ministry of the Interior. They were organized along the lines of the Soviet Union's Interior Troops as a light infantry military force. As such, they were deemed inadequate to provide the Ministry of the Interior with the rapid and flexible response needed to counter highly trained and nimble terror organizations that emerged in the global terror wave of the 1970s.

The Minister of the Interior at that time Colonel general Dimitar Stoyanov issued an order on December 14, 1978, for the formation of a Specialized Operational Militia Unit (Bulgarian abbreviation SOMP standing for Специално оперативно милиционерско поделение (СОМП)), which is the forerunner of the SOBT. The unit was based in Sofia and was subordinated to the regional Sofia City Headquarters of the People's Militia (the police department of the capitol). The SOMP was organized into 3 assault companies, a signals platoon, and a support group (combining combat and combat service support specialists such as snipers, sappers, martial arts instructors, paratroopers, repair technicians, etc.).

Shortly after the formation of the unit, it was deployed on May 24, 1981, when a Turkish McDonnell Douglas DC-9 airliner on a regular flight from Ankara to Istanbul was hijacked by four Turkish nationals and forced to land at the Burgas Airport. In the combined assault mounted by Bulgarian and Turkish commandos, one hijacker was shot dead and the other three were arrested with no casualties among the hostages.

On March 7, 1983, four Bulgarian nationals hijacked a Balkan Bulgarian Airlines Antonov An-24 on a scheduled flight from Sofia to Varna and demanded that the airplane is diverted to Vienna. The Bulgarian authorities ordered the pilots to fly to Varna while assuring the hijackers that their demands are met and they were en route to the Austrian capital. In the meantime, a Yakovlev Yak-40 business jet with an assault group of the SOMP takes off from Sofia and overtakes the An-24 landing at the final destination ahead of it. As the flight takes place at night the local police authorities shut down the electricity in the city during the approach of the hijacked airplane to make it harder for the terrorists on board to spot the Black Sea - a highly observable indicator that this was not Vienna. In the subsequent assault, the hijackers were apprehended and the hostages were freed unharmed.

On October 3, 1986, the SOMP joins the few counter-terrorism units worldwide that have successfully executed operations abroad. A group of 86 Iranians, including women and children (still more than half of them are well-built men of military age), flee the general mobilization for the Iran–Iraq War. They first arrive in Turkey, where they contract a local travel agency to organize a vacation to East Berlin, chartering a Balkan Bulgarian Airlines Tupolev Tu-154 from Burgas Airport. They plan to flee to West Berlin, seeking political asylum. When they arrive at Berlin Schönefeld Airport however their plan is thwarted as the West Berlin authorities refuse to admit them on their sole without proper visas. The East German border control officials at the airport collect their passports and refuse to let them off the airplane to contain a rising international scandal. The frustrated passengers take the pilots and the air hostesses of the flight and cabin crew hostages and demand that the airplane is refueled and diverted to Sweden. The Bulgarian government is informed and on the following morning the commander of SOMP Lt-col. Vasil Velkov flies off to Berlin together with the ready assault group of Captain Dimitar Stefanov, consisting of 5 squads of 3 master sergeants each for a total of 17 people. To deceive the hijackers the East German authorities inform them that the Swedish government has accepted the flight, but the Bulgarian Tupolev Tu-154 is unable to fulfill it so they need to board another airplane. The Bulgarian special forces devise a plan in which they hide in the Ikarus bus sent under that pretext to approach the airliner covertly and once the ladders are in place and the doors are opened to storm in, forcing their way from the pilot cabin to the back of the plane. Although the assault group is heavily armed with AK-74s, machine guns, sniper rifles, pistols, stun, tear gas, and smoke grenades an incredibly bold decision is taken that the assault group should leave all their firearms and combat knives behind and use only hand-to-hand combat to overwhelm the hijackers to not endanger the hostages. Of the five 3-men squads breach into the airliner, and the fifth stays out of it in reserve. The resistance of the Iranians is rapidly overwhelmed. The Bulgarian commandos are unharmed, and some of the Iranians suffer minor injuries. The plane is refueled and takes off back for Burgas. Shortly after it gets airborne the hijackers riot on board when they find out the destination. They are once again rapidly subdued but out of desperation some of them commit suicide, cutting their wrists with shattered glass from beverages. Once the airliner lands all the Iranians are transported to the border and turned over to the Turkish authorities.

During the 1980s the Bulgarian Communist government started a process of forceful assimilation of the Turkish minority, known as the "Revival Process", which triggered a series of terror acts in the whole country. The SOMP was directly involved in countering them and apprehending the perpetrators. In May 1986 the unit was reorganized. The name was changed from Specialized Operational Militia Unit to Specialized Unit for Combating Terrorism (Bulgarian: Специално поделение за борба с тероризма (SPBT)).

It was also taken out of the regional militia department of Sofia and subordinated to the Department "Terror", 6th Directorate of the Committee for State Security. The internal structure was also overhauled. The previous 3 assault companies, 1 signals platoon, and 1 support group were reshuffled into 4 identical operational combat detachments. Each detachment was made up of 3 sections and each section was made up of 12 operatives. This new internal organization enabled the continuous readiness of the unit. Under the new operational regimen, the detachments rotated in 24-hour shifts. A stand-by shift was followed by 48 hours of rest and recuperation and a training shift of 24 hours after which the detachment went into a 24-hour stand-by shift a so on.

After the Communist regime came down the Committee for State Security was disbanded and its directorates became separate services for intelligence, counterintelligence, combating organized crime, and close protection service for the state officials, etc. The unit was placed directly under the subordination of the Minister of the Interior.

In total 152 men are serving in the SOBT.

In the year 2003 the unit was once again reorganized, gaining its current name of Special Counter Terrorism Unit (Bulgarian: Специализиран отряд за борба с тероризма (SOBT)) and the following structure:

Headquarters (14 men)
Office (5 men)
Planning Group (6 men)
Logistics Department (26 men)
 Transportation and vehicles (11 men)
 Communication (3 men)
 Armory (2 men)
 Economic base (10 men)
Operations and Missions Department (101 men)
 Headquarters (9 men)
 Defense and tactical security (4 men)
 4 Commando groups/ Sectors 01-04 (19 men)
 Group leader (1 man)
 3 Teams  (6 men)
 Sector "Training and Education" (12 men)
 Fitness and martial arts (1 man)
 Group "Combat and Para" (5 men)
 Group "Tactical Training" (2 men)
 Group "Strategic Training" (2 men)
 Group "Pyrotechnics and Demolitions" (2 men)

Training and selection
In general SOBT personnel served previously in the Bulgarian Armed Forces, usually in the Land Forces. As they rise in rank and show their merit of skill and military prowess and leadership skills, they can apply to train with the SOBT, though sometimes the SOBT will come to them. Training lasts for about 18 months and that is usually enough time for the men to go through all of the training to be a regular in SOBT terms. To be a team leader requires extensive training that could mean at least one more year of training though some train for three additional years. After their first year of training, the regulars go through more specific training depending on what they wish to become, whether it be a Squad Leader, Engineer, Weapons Specialist, Medic Specialist, or Comm (Communications) Specialist. Further training time also depends on their choice. The SOBT has conducted training exercises with the Spetsnaz of Russia as well as other respected foreign special forces teams, such as the RAID (French Police unit). Afterward, SOBT operators are assembled into squads depending on each mission they take. Platoon, company, and squad numbers vary from mission to mission.

Equipment

Armor
The SOBT uses armored vehicles to get around and a body armor superior in ballistic characteristics to the standard Kevlar Vest. They also use other heat and fire resistant clothing as well as various weather-proof clothes.

References

External links
Spetsnaz-BG:How to enter SOBT

Non-military counterterrorist organizations
Special forces of Bulgaria
Terrorism in Bulgaria
ATLAS Network